In mathematics, a dispersive partial differential equation or dispersive PDE  is a partial differential equation that is dispersive. In this context, dispersion means that waves of different wavelength propagate at different phase velocities.

Examples

Linear equations
Euler–Bernoulli beam equation with time-dependent loading
Airy equation
Schrödinger equation
Klein–Gordon equation

Nonlinear equations
nonlinear Schrödinger equation
Korteweg–de Vries equation (or KdV equation)
Boussinesq equation (water waves)
sine–Gordon equation

See also

Dispersion (optics)
Dispersion (water waves)
Dispersionless equation

External links

The Dispersive PDE Wiki.

Partial differential equations
Nonlinear systems